Cyprian Godebski (1765 – 19 April 1809) was a Polish poet, novelist and father of writer Franciszek Ksawery. He was an outstanding poet of the so-called "Legions Poetry".

Life

Godebski served in the Polish Legions from 1798 until 1801. From 1803 to 1806 he became, together with Ksawery Kossecki, publisher and editor of the "Zabawy Przyjemne i Pozyteczne" almanac. From 1805 he was a member of the Friends of Science Society. In 1806 Godebski joined the Polish Army of the Duchy of Warsaw; he had become disillusioned with the policy of Napoleon towards Poland. He died in the Battle of Raszyn in 1809.

References

1765 births
1809 deaths
Polish poets
18th-century Polish–Lithuanian novelists
19th-century Polish novelists
Polish male novelists
Polish commanders of the Napoleonic Wars
Polish Army officers
Polish military personnel killed in action
Military personnel killed in the Napoleonic Wars
Kościuszko insurgents